Aleksandrs Cuncukovs (born April 3, 1971), commonly spelled as Alexander Chunchukov in North America, is a Latvian former professional ice hockey player.

Career
Cuncukovs played his professional career in Russia (1991–94). He continued his career in the East Coast Hockey League (now ECHL) with stops in Raleigh (1994–95), Nashville (1995–96), and Johnstown (1996–97). After leaving the ECHL, he joined the Central Hockey League and played in Nashville (1997–98), Fayetteville (1998–2001), eventually playing the final ten games of his career with the Huntsville Tornado in 2001.

Cuncukovs represented his country twice at the World Cup, playing with the Latvia men's national ice hockey team at the 1994 and 1996 Men's World Ice Hockey Championships.

Awards and accomplishments
1997–98: CHL All-Star Game
1997–98: CHL All-Star Game MVP (as a member of the Nashville Ice Flyers)
1998–99: CHL All-Star

Transactions
1998: Acquired by the Fayetteville Force via Dispersal Draft

Statistics

Regular season and playoffs

References

Living people
1971 births
Fayetteville Force players
Huntsville Tornado players
Johnstown Chiefs players
Latvian ice hockey right wingers
Nashville Knights players
Raleigh Icecaps players
Ice hockey people from Riga